Paul Lord (22 December 1967) is an English former professional rugby league footballer who played in the 1980s and 1990s.

Playing career

County Cup Final appearances
Paul Lord played , i.e. number 5, and scored a try in Oldham's 16-24 defeat by Warrington in the 1989–90 Lancashire County Cup Final during the 1989–90 season at Knowsley Road, St. Helens on Saturday 14 October 1989.

Genealogical information
Paul Lord is the younger brother of the rugby league footballer; Gary Lord.

References

External links
Stanley Rangers ARLFC - Roll of Honour
(archived by web.archive.org) Statistics at orl-heritagetrust.org.uk

1967 births
Living people
Doncaster R.L.F.C. players
English rugby league players
Oldham R.L.F.C. players
Place of birth missing (living people)
Rugby league wingers
Rugby league players from Wakefield
Swinton Lions players
Wakefield Trinity players